Melampus nuxeastaneus is a species of small air-breathing salt marsh snail, a pulmonate gastropod mollusk in the family Ellobiidae.

Distribution 
The distribution of this species include:
 Japan
 Pratas Island, Taiwan

References

Ellobiidae
Gastropods described in 1949